Mount Pleasant is a community in the Canadian province of Nova Scotia, in the Region of Queens, Nova Scotia.

References
 Mount Pleasant on Destination Nova Scotia

Communities in the Region of Queens Municipality
General Service Areas in Nova Scotia